Sh 2-2, also known as Sharpless 2, is an emission nebula in the constellation of Scorpius. It appears as a mid-range brightness making it difficult to view. It is believed to currently host an X-ray binary star that originated and was ejected from the Scorpius OB1 association. Amateur astronomers can usually see it with a wide field telescope and a hydrogen-alpha filter.

The nebulous area is fairly large with an irregular shape appearing as a H II region. The remnant has an apparent diameter that covers approximately 60'.

References

External links
 

Emission nebulae
Scorpius (constellation)
Sharpless objects